The men's 50 kilometres race walk at the 1962 European Athletics Championships was held in Belgrade, then Yugoslavia, on 14 September 1962.

Medalists

Results

Final
14 September

Participation
According to an unofficial count, 21 athletes from 10 countries participated in the event.

 (1)
 (2)
 (3)
 (1)
 (3)
 (1)
 (3)
 (2)
 (2)
 (3)

References

50 kilometres race walk
Racewalking at the European Athletics Championships